A Flying Jatt is a 2016 Indian superhero film co-written and directed by Remo D'Souza and produced under the banner of Balaji Motion Pictures. It features Tiger Shroff, Jacqueline Fernandez and Nathan Jones in the lead roles. A Flying Jatt narrates the story of Aman Dhillon, a teenager (Shroff) who gains superpowers from a divine tree. 

The film released worldwide on 25 August 2016 on Janmashtami weekend. The film received mixed-to-negative reviews.

Plot
Wealthy and influential builder Mr. Rakesh Malhotra has built a factory on the shore of a lake into which pollutants and toxic waste are released. He wants to build a bridge across it for faster transportation. Still, He cannot do so due to a sacred tree present on the other side of the lake on a piece of land that belongs to Mrs. Dhillon, a religious but irrepressible Punjabi woman living with her son Aman Dhillon and his brother, Rohit Dhillon. Aman is a martial arts teacher in a school and has a crush on Kirti, a fellow teacher. After Malhotra fails to intimidate the Dhillon family into selling their land, he brings in Raka, a mercenary, to get the job done. Raka arrives at the tree with a chainsaw, but Aman is present there and tries to stop him. Raka beats Aman badly but moments, before he tries to decapitate him with the chainsaw, saw a lightning bolt hits the tree. The impact flings Raka away, and he lands amongst barrels of toxic waste outside Malhotra's factory. 

The next morning, Aman finds himself in his bed alive with no sign of any injury and presumes all that happened to be a dream. He also notices a khanda that has appeared on his back, the same symbol which was carved on the tree and had been imprinted on him during the attack. Later that day, he and his brother notice a few unusual things happening to him, such as increased agility and the ability to absorb information by touching objects. After escaping an ambush using super speed, Rohit and his mother confirm that Aman has somehow gained superpowers. She immediately declares him a superhero. After making him a costume and showing him several superhero films for inspiration, Aman's mother tells him the story of his father, Sardar Kartar Singh Dhillon, a Sikh who went to Shaolin to learn martial arts and was named "Flying Jatt". She asks Aman to take up the legacy of his father and keep Flying Jatt as his superhero name to which he agrees. Although his superhero exploits get off to a rocky start, Flying Jatt is soon recognized when he saves hostages from a terrorist attack at an airport. As he gains even more success being a hero, Aman proposes to Kirti and reveals his secret identity to her.

Raka is found alive but is now stronger and more dangerous than before after being exposed to the pollutants at the factory, which further exposure continues to make him even more powerful. Aman goes on to battle him several times, beating Raka each time before finally becoming gravely injured in a brutal fight. To save him from further pain, his brother Rohit goes in his place as Flying Jatt and gets brutally beaten by Raka and dies. After this, Aman is very angry about the death of his brother and kills Raka, and becomes a Sikh Sardar.

Cast
 Tiger Shroff as Aman Dhillon / Flying Jatt
 Jacqueline Fernandez as Kirti
 Nathan Jones as Raka
 Kay Kay Menon as Mr. Rakesh Malhotra
 Amrita Singh as Mrs. Dhillon
 Gaurav Pandey as Rohit Dhillon
 Sushant Pujari as Goldy
 Shraddha Kapoor as Herself (cameo appearance)
 Vijeta Maru as Himself

Reception
A Flying Jatt received mixed-to-negative reviews, who appreciated cast performance, visual effects, music direction and action sequences, but criticised for script, narration, pace, inconsistent tone, clichès and direction. On review aggregator website Rotten Tomatoes, A Flying Jatt has an approval rating of 43% on the basis of 7 reviews with an average rating of 4.8 out of 10.

Srijana Mitra Das from The Times of India gave the film 3.5 out of 5 stars and stated, "Tiger does a neat job as Aman, shivering superhero who fights crime but also buys 'do kilo lauki' on the way home".

Firstpost said, "The film's comedy, occasional inventiveness and aura of innocence are what make it effective in its own way, despite the lack of depth. D'souza had displayed his natural wit even in his first film F.A.L.T.U. in 2011. A Flying Jatt could have been so much better than what it is, if he had not kept one eye fixed Westward for inspiration. This one is perhaps best suited to the very very young."

Sarita Tanwar from Daily News and Analysis gave the film 2 out of 5 stars and said, "You'll need superhero levels of patience to watch this".

Anupama Chopra from the Hindustan Times gave the film 1.5 stars out of 5, and said "The first half of A Flying Jatt has moments of fun – I loved that despite being a superhero he has a fear of heights, so he flies very close to the ground. But post-interval, laughter takes a back seat."

HuffPost critic Suprateek Chatterjee asked the question, "Why does this even exist?" and stated, "Remo D'Souza's superhero flick is a symbol of Bollywood's laziness and creative bankruptcy".

Soundtrack

Graphic novel
A Flying Jatt has been made into a graphic novel by Thought Bubbles Studio Planet. The story continues where the film ends.

Awards and nominations

References

External links
 

2010s Hindi-language films
2016 films
2016 action comedy films
2010s Indian superhero films
Indian fantasy action films
Indian action comedy films
Indian fantasy comedy films
2010s fantasy comedy films
Films set in Mumbai
Bioterrorism in fiction
Teen superhero comedy films
Indian films with live action and animation
Films using motion capture
Indian vigilante films
2010s vigilante films
Indian films about revenge
Balaji Motion Pictures films
Films about Sikhism
2016 comedy films
Films directed by Remo D'Souza
Indian superhero films